In automata theory, an alternating tree automaton (ATA) is an extension of nondeterministic tree automaton as same as alternating finite automaton extends nondeterministic finite automaton (NFA).

Computational complexity 

The emptiness problem (deciding whether the language of an input ATA is empty) and the universality problem for ATAs are EXPTIME-complete. The membership problem (testing whether an input tree is accepted by an input AFA) is in PTIME.

References 

Automata (computation)